Curtis Rowe, Jr. (born July 2, 1949) is an American retired basketball player.

A 6'7" forward from UCLA, Rowe was drafted by the Dallas Chaparrals in the 1971 ABA Draft and by the Detroit Pistons in the first round of the 1971 NBA Draft.  Rowe opted to sign with Detroit and the NBA.

Rowe played eight seasons (1971–1979) in the National Basketball Association as a member of the Detroit Pistons and the Boston Celtics.  He averaged 11.6 points per game in his career and appeared in the 1976 NBA All-Star Game.

At UCLA, he was a member of three national championship teams coached by John Wooden: 1969, 1970 and 1971. He was one of only 4 players to have started on 3 NCAA championship teams; the others were all teammates at UCLA: Lew Alcindor, Henry Bibby and Lynn Shackelford.

In 1993 Rowe was inducted to the UCLA Athletic Hall of Fame.

NBA career statistics

Regular season

Playoffs

Personal life 
Curtis Rowe is the father of comedian Cameron Rowe.

References

External links

1949 births
Living people
African-American basketball players
All-American college men's basketball players
American men's basketball players
Basketball players from Alabama
Boston Celtics players
Dallas Chaparrals draft picks
Detroit Pistons draft picks
Detroit Pistons players
John C. Fremont High School alumni
National Basketball Association All-Stars
Parade High School All-Americans (boys' basketball)
Power forwards (basketball)
Sportspeople from Bessemer, Alabama
UCLA Bruins men's basketball players
21st-century African-American people
20th-century African-American sportspeople